Justin Yifu Lin (born on October 15, 1952) is a Chinese economist and professor of economics at Peking University. He served as the Chief Economist and Senior Vice President of the World Bank from 2008 to 2012. He has been appointed as China State Council Counsellor since September 2013.

As a ground force captain and company commander on Kinmen Islands, Lin swam across a channel and sought refuge in Xiamen, Mainland China in May 1979. Lin turned into an economist after pursuing graduate studies in economics at Peking University and the University of Chicago, where he respectively received a master of economics in 1982 and a PhD degree in 1986. His doctoral advisor at the University of Chicago was Nobel laureate economist Theodore Schultz. After completing his postdoctoral studies at Yale University, he returned to Beijing and became a professor of economics at Peking University in 1987. He founded the China Center for Economic Research (currently the Peking University National School of Development) and was later appointed Chief Economist and Senior Vice President of the World Bank where he served from 2008 to 2012. After that, he returned to Beijing and to his research at Peking University.

His main academic theory is called New Structural Economics.

At Peking University, he currently serves as the Dean of the Institute of New Structural Economics, the Honorary Dean of the National Development Institute, and the Dean of the Institute of South-South Cooperation and Development.

Biography

Early life
Lin was born on 15 October 1952 in Yilan County, Taiwan, as Lin Zhengyi. Lin attended high school in National Yilan Senior High School. In 1971, he was admitted to the National Taiwan University's College of agriculture to study agricultural machinery under the department of agricultural engineering. Michael Pillsbury remembered Lin being the president of the student body in 1971 while was studying Chinese at the same university. In 1971, Lin left school as a freshman student for volunteer military service in the army.

Early education and seeking asylum 

In 1976 Lin entered the MBA program at National Chengchi University in Taiwan on a defense scholarship and returned to the army upon receiving his MBA in 1978. As a captain in the Republic of China Army in Taiwan, he swam from Kinmen Islands to Xiamen, Mainland China for asylum on May 17, 1979. Lin left his pregnant wife and his three-year-old child in Taiwan; a year after his asylum, he was declared "missing" by the ROC Army and his wife claimed the equivalent of US$31,000 from the government. His wife and their children joined him years later when both of them went to study in the United States. While an officer in the ROC Army, Lin was held up as a model soldier; after his desertion, the ROC originally listed him as missing but in 2000 issued an order for his arrest on charges of defection.

In a letter written to his family in Taiwan about a year after his asylum, Lin stated that "based on my cultural, historical, political, economic and military understanding, it is my belief that returning to the motherland is a historical inevitability; it is also the optimal choice." A National Taiwan University alumnus  confirmed Lin's reason and motive. Lin's oldest brother said it was unfair to brand his younger brother a traitor. "I don't understand why people regard him as a villain," he said. "My brother just wanted to pursue his ambitions."

Later education and career
Lin received a master's degree in political economy from Peking University in 1982, and a PhD in economics from the University of Chicago in 1986. He was one of the first PRC citizens to receive a PhD in economics from the University of Chicago.

On September 16, 2008, Fordham University honored Lin with a reception for being chief economist and senior vice president of the World Bank.

Lin received an Honorary Doctorate from Fordham in 2009 and was elected a Corresponding Fellow of the British Academy in 2010. His 2012 book, The Quest for Prosperity: How Developing Economies Can Take Off, argued for an active role for government in nurturing development, not just through the traditional provision of infrastructure and legal enforcement, but also by identifying and actively supporting industries that contribute to growth.

Lin is the founder and first director of the China Center for Economic Research and a former professor of economics at Peking University and at the Hong Kong University of Science and Technology. He is also an adviser to the China Finance 40 Forum (CF40).

Works

Selected books 
 Lin, Justin Yifu, Fang Cai, and Zhou Li. The China Miracle: Development Strategy and Economic Reform. Hong Kong: Chinese University Press, 2003.
 Lin, Justin Yifu. Demystifying the Chinese Economy. Cambridge: Cambridge University Press, 2011.
 Lin, Justin Yifu. The Quest for Prosperity: How Developing Economies Can Take Off. Princeton, NJ: Princeton University Press, 2012.
 Lin, Justin Yifu. New structural economics: A framework for rethinking development and policy. The World Bank, 2012.

Selected articles 
 Lin, Justin Yifu. “The Household Responsibility System in China’s Agricultural Reform: A Theoretical and Empirical Study.” Economic Development and Cultural Change 36, no. 3 (1988): 199–224.
 Lin, Justin Yifu. “Rural Reforms and Agricultural Growth in China,” American Economic Review, 82 no. 1 (1992): 34-51.
 Lin, Justin Yifu and Dennis Tao Yang. “On the Causes of China’s Agricultural Crisis and the Great Leap Famine,” China Economic Review 9, no. 2 (1998): 125–140.
 Lin, Justin Yifu. “Competition, Policy Burdens, and State-owned Enterprise Reform,” American Economic Review, 88 no. 2 (1998): 422-27.
 Lin, Justin Yifu. and Zhiqiang Liu. “Fiscal Decentralization and Economic Growth in China.” Economic Development and Cultural Change 49, no. 1 (2000): 1–21.
 Lin, Justin Yifu. “China and the Global Economy,” China Economic Journal, 4 no. 1 (2011): 1-14
 Lin, Justin Yifu. “New Structural Economics: A Framework for Rethinking Development,” World Bank Research Observer, 26, no. 2 (2011): 193-221.

References

External links

 Lin Yifu, China Vitae.
 Justin Yifu Lin biography, CCER website, accessed December 2005.
 World Bank Chief Economist: Justin Yifu Lin
 "Development and Transition: Idea, Strategy and Viability" at the Chinese University of Hong Kong, March 31, 2008
 Economist Lin Yifu says the poor should get rich quicker

1952 births
Chinese officials of the United Nations
Corresponding Fellows of the British Academy
Delegates to the 11th National People's Congress
Fugitives wanted by Taiwan
Living people
Members of the 7th Chinese People's Political Consultative Conference
Members of the 8th Chinese People's Political Consultative Conference
Members of the 9th Chinese People's Political Consultative Conference
Members of the 10th Chinese People's Political Consultative Conference
Members of the 12th Chinese People's Political Consultative Conference
Members of the 13th Chinese People's Political Consultative Conference
National Taiwan University alumni
National Chengchi University alumni
Peking University alumni
Academic staff of Peking University
People from Yilan County, Taiwan
People's Republic of China economists
People's Republic of China writers
Taiwanese defectors
University of Chicago alumni
World Bank Chief Economists